Hypercompe oslari is a moth of the family Erebidae first described by Walter Rothschild in 1910. It is found from the extreme south of Texas south into Mexico.

References

Moths described in 1910
Hypercompe